These are the Canadian number-one albums of 1988. The chart is compiled by Nielsen Soundscan and published by Jam! Canoe, issued every Sunday. The chart also appears in Billboard magazine as Top Canadian Albums.

See also
List of Canadian number-one singles of 1988

References

External links
Top 100 albums in Canada on Jam
Billboard Top Canadian Albums

1988
1988 record charts
1988 in Canadian music